The history of Freemasonry in Ghana can be traced to the early nineteenth century when the first Masonic lodge was consecrated in the country. The practice of Freemasonry was imported to the then Gold Coast and other Commonwealth realms by European residents in the nation during the British colonial era. Most of the lodges in Ghana are governed by the United Grand Lodge of England (UGLE) and Wales, Grand Lodge of Scotland and the Grand Lodge of Ireland. Similar to their sister organisations worldwide, Ghanaian masonic fraternities are nonsectarian, with proceedings of the societies being strictly apolitical and non–religious.

History 
Like other lodges in the six million–member global fraternity, Ghanaian Freemasons are expected to believe in the immortality of the soul and in a Creator or a Supreme Being, sometimes referred to as the Grand Architect of the Universe. Membership is open to all irrespective of ethnicity or social background. The oldest grand lodges were consecrated in England (1717), Ireland (1725), France (1728), the United States (1730) and Scotland (1736). Membership is either by invitation only or free–will depending on the geographic region.

The inspiration for freemasonry is connected to the ancient days of the biblical Solomonic Temple, 4000 years ago, through to the craft of stonemasonry in the  Middle Ages. The craft of Freemasonry is found in the Holy Books (Bible, Torah, Vedas, Quran), the old charges or old manuscripts and old lodge charters dating to circa 1390, and in Masonic books. In Europe and Ottoman territories, each country formed its own Masonic Speculative Lodges and Grand Orient Lodges. There have been records of ancient lodges in Beirut, Damascus and Tripoli.

Principles 
Members are taught the principles of fellowship and friendships with emphasis on education, personal integrity, personal responsibility, character, morality, ethics, philanthropy and social/charitable contributions. Historically, the core principles of Ghanaian Freemasonry include brotherly love, relief and truth. Masonic meetings forbid political discussions. While its laws are made public, the internal affairs of Ghanaian Freemasonry are considered private.

District Grand Lodge of Ghana 
The records of the first lodges on the Gold Coast indicate that the Torridzonian Lodge No. 621 was consecrated in 1810. In 1833, another lodge, Cape Coast Lodge No. 599 was constituted. By 1863, both lodges had become defunct. In 1859, the United Grand Lodge of England constituted the Gold Coast Lodge, No. 1075 English Constitution, (later numbered 773) which has been active since that period.  At the turn of the nineteenth century and the first decade of the twentieth century, several lodges were consecrated under the English Constitution of the UGLE:
 Victoria Lodge No. 2393 on 2 December 1891 in Accra
 Accra Lodge No. 3063 on 2 March 1905, in Accra
 Sekondi Lodge No. 3238 on 19 March 1908, in Sekondi
 Taquah Lodge No. 3356 on 27 May 1909, in Tarkwa
 Ashanti Lodge No. 3717 on 20 March 1914 based in Kumasi
 St. George’s Lodge No. 3851 on 25 September 1918 based in Sekondi
 McCarthy Lodge No. 4132 on 29 January 1921 also based in Kumasi
The Grand Lodge of Scotland entered the fray in 1921 when it issued a charter to establish Lodge Progressive No. 1261 on 30 November 1921, in Cape Coast. Subsequently, a series of lodges were consecrated under the Scottish constitution: 
 Lodge St. Andrew No. 1299 on 12 January 1924 in Accra
 Lodge Morality No. 1362 on 29 December 1929 in Kumasi
 Lodge Unity No. 1466 on 29 December 1951 in Accra
 Lodge Fidelity No. 1468 on 26 January 1952 in Takoradi
 Lodge Kumasi No. 1472 on 1 November 1952 in Kumasi
 Lodge Charity No. 1473 on 3 January 1953 in Accra
 Lodge Achimota No. 1522 on 29 December 1956 in Accra
As more lodges were erected, a petition by the ten Lodges under the United Grand Lodge of England for a District Grand Lodge was granted.  The District Grand Lodge of the Gold Coast under the English Constitution was inaugurated in Accra on 9 May 1931. In January 1953 the seven Gold Coast Lodges under the Grand Lodge of Scotland petitioned for a District Grand Lodge of the Gold Coast under the Scottish Constitution which was inaugurated on 17 January 1953. When Ghana attained its independence from the United Kingdom in 1957, the St. Patrick Lodge No. 793, was consecrated on 16 March 1957 and was the sole Lodge in Ghana Warrant granted by the Grand Lodge of Ireland for 14 years. Thus, all three of the “Home Grand Lodges" had representation in Ghana. Beginning in 1971, six new Lodges were consecrated under Warrant granted by the Grand Lodge of Ireland: 
 Abuakwa Lodge No. 840 on 9 January 1971 in Akwatia
 Saltpond Lodge No. 841 on 28 August 1971 in Saltpond
 Ahanta Lodge No. 843 on 20 May 1972 in Sekondi
 Asante Kotoko Lodge No. 844 on 1 July 1972 in Kumasi
 Adanisman Lodge No. 849 on 4 April 1973 in Obuasi
 Sekyere Lodge No. 850 on 28 April 1973 in Asante Mampong
The seven Lodges, operating under the Irish constitution petitioned and received approval for a Provincial Grand Lodge of Ghana, formed on 1 September 1973.  In early 1994, a lecture titled “Let us Have a United Grand Lodge of Ghana” was presented at the meeting of Unicorn Lodge No. 8840, English Constitution with proposals made to achieve the unification objective.  The Ghanaian quantity surveyor, politician and a Freemason, Harry Sawyerr delivered a speech at the Diamond Jubilee Celebration of Lodge St. Andrew No. 1299 Scottish Constitution, outlining how recognition for the United Grand Lodge of Ghana could be achieved.

On 9 June 2003, at an Open Forum held under the aegis of the Concordia Lodge No. 7199, English Constitution, with representatives from all the three Masonic Constitutions in Ghana, the idea of the United Grand Lodge of Ghana was discussed at length.  In 2004, the Provincial Grand Master of Ghana Irish Constitution, Nana Herman Mould and the District Grand Master Scottish Constitution, Charles William Stanley–Pierre and District Grand Master of Ghana English Constitution, Kow Abaka Quansah conferred on establishing the Grand Lodge of Ghana. The then Provincial Grand Master–Designate of the Irish Constitution, John Atta–Quayson, attended the meeting. Other Masons who advocated for a joint lodge were Fredua, Mensah, then Provincial Grand Master of the Irish Constitution, D. S. Quarcoopome, then District Grand Master Scottish Constitution and later still Nana Herman A. Mould as Provincial Grand Master, Irish Constitution. The District Grand Lodge of Ghana, English Constitution was not in favour of a Grand Lodge of Ghana and therefore the unified entity was limited to the Scottish District and the Irish Province. Thus none of 57 English Constitution Lodge joined the Grand Lodge of Ghana.

Grand Lodge of Ghana 
The Provincial Grand Master, Irish Constitution and District Grand Master, Scottish Constitution, formed a Joint–Committee for rolling out the steps for establishing the Grand Lodge of Ghana. Within three years, the committee produced a draft Constitution and Laws for the Grand Lodge of Ghana, Ritual for Opening and Closing Grand Lodge, Regalia and paraphernalia for Grand Lodge, Provincial Grand Lodges and Subordinate Lodges, as well as miscellaneous Documents, including Warrants, Letters of Commission, Forms and Books of administration.  Fundraising activities for the formation of the Grand Lodge were also developed and periodic progress reports issued to the aspiring members.  The Joint–Committee transformed into a Steering Committee for the formation of the lodge. For further deliberations, four open for a were held at the: 
 Freemasons’ Hall, Adjabeng, Accra on 7 May 2008
 Freemasons’ Hall, Ahodwo, Kumasi on 14 May 2008
 Freemasons’ Hall, Windy Ridge, Takoradi on 28 May 2008
 Freemasons’ Hall, Aboom Wells Road, Cape Coast on 28 May 2008
A consultative assembly of accredited lodge members was convened to review and approve the draft constitution and laws on Saturday 7 June 2008. On Saturday 12 July 2008, the Electoral College assembled to elect the first Grand Master of the Grand Lodge of Ghana.  Approximately 49 subordinate Lodges, made up of 21 Irish Lodges and 28 Scottish constitute the foundation lodges under novel warrants granted by the Grand Lodge of Ghana with new numbering based on the date of Consecration/Constitution and grouped into three Provincial Grand Lodges:
 Provincial Grand Lodge, South East, located in Accra with 20 Lodges
 Provincial Grand Lodge, South West, located in Cape Coast with 17 Lodges
 Provincial Grand Lodge, North, located in Kumasi with 12 Lodges
The Grand Lodge of Ghana was formally founded on 24 January 2009 as a "Sovereign Masonic Body" under the auspices of the Grand Lodge of Ireland, led by the Grand Master George Dunlop, and Grand Master Mason of Scotland, Charles Iain Robert Wolridge Gordon of Esselmont.  The United Grand Lodge of England (UGLE) was the first Grand Lodge to pass a resolution to recognise the newly–constituted Grand Lodge of Ghana. Charles William Stanley–Pierre was installed the first Grand Master. In 2013, he was succeeded by Otwasuom Osae Nyampong VI. The motto of the Grand Lodge of Ghana is “That All Shall Be One.”

Chapters 
The following are the chapters of Masonic chapters in Ghana:

Lodges 
Lodges established in different cities in Ghana include:

Grand Masters

District Grand Lodge of Ghana

Grand Lodge of Ghana

Sister organisations in Anglophone West Africa

Liberia 
Freemasonry in Liberia started in 1867 when the craft was brought to the country by Americo–Liberian settlers, descendants of freed slaves in the United States. The Grand Lodge of Liberia is based in Monrovia, its traditions are steeped in the Prince Hall Freemasonry, the United States Masonic Lodge, predominantly populated by African-American men. The Grand Lodge of Liberia is the first independent, self–initiated Masonic lodge in Africa. With 1750 members, 14 out of 19 subordinate lodges were re–activated in 1988 after the Liberian Civil War. The fourth edition of the 1992 Prince Hall Masonic Directory lists 500 members from the 19 lodges before the conflict. The fifth edition of the directory (1997) listed 13 lodges and there was no entry for the sixth edition (2003). In 1999, the United Grand Lodge of England recognised the Grand Lodge of Liberia. In 2000, the Government of Liberia Gazette noted the death of the Deputy Grand Master of Liberia.

Nigeria 
With 51 lodges, the Grand Lodge of Nigeria is based in Calabar near Cross River and on the coast of southeastern Nigeria.  The Masonic society was founded on 3 November 2012 by the Grand Master Mason of Scotland. The pioneer Grand Master of the Nigerian Grand Lodge was consecrated by the Grand Master of Ireland. About 20 lodges of the Irish Provincial Grand Lodge and 31 of the 45 lodges of the Scottish District Grand Lodge came together to form the unified grand lodge. Like its Ghanaian counterpart, the District Grand Lodge of Nigeria, English Constitution, declined to join the new partnership. As such, none of 33 English Constitution lodges became members of the Grand Lodge of Nigeria and are still under the UGLE. The remaining 14 lodges under the Scottish tradition are still members of the District Grand Lodge, Scottish Constitution.

Notable people  
Prominent Ghanaian Masons include:

Heads of State 

Joseph Arthur Ankrah, military officer and Head of State of Ghana, 1966 –1969
Akwasi Afrifa, military officer, farmer and Head of State of Ghana, 1969 –1970
John Kufuor, President of Ghana, 2001–2009; Senior Grand Warden, United Grand Lodge of England

Diplomats 

 James Aggrey-Orleans, diplomat and civil servant, High Commissioner of Ghana to the United Kingdom, 1997  – 2001
 Edward Asafu-Adjaye, lawyer, diplomat and politician, first High Commissioner of Ghana to the United Kingdom, 1957 – 1962
 K. B. Asante, diplomat, educator and civil servant
 Francis Lodowic Bartels, diplomat and educator, Ambassador of Ghana to West Germany, 1970 – 1972
 William George Mensah Brandful, diplomat

Health services 

Charles Odamtten Easmon, first Ghanaian surgeon specialist and the first Dean, University of Ghana Medical School, Deputy District Grandmaster,  Masonic District of Ghana
Ernest James Hayford, Gold Coast physician and lawyer

Legislature 

 Augustus Molade Akiwumi, lawyer, judge and second Speaker of the Parliament of Ghana, 1958 – 1960
 Jacob Hackenburg Griffiths-Randolph, judge and Speaker of the Parliament of Ghana in the Third Republic, 1979 –1981
 Nii Amaa Ollenu, jurist, judge and Speaker of the Parliament of Ghana in the Second Republic, 1969 – 1972
 Emmanuel Charles Quist, barrister, judge and the first African Speaker of the Legislative Council and first Speaker of the Parliament of Ghana, 1949 –1957
 Ebenezer Sekyi-Hughes, lawyer and Speaker of the Parliament of Ghana, 2005 –2009

Judiciary 

 Isaac Kobina Abban, Chief Justice of Ghana, 1995 – 2001
 Vincent Cyril Richard Arthur Charles Crabbe, jurist and Justice of the Supreme Court of Ghana
 Kobina Arku Korsah, first Chief Justice of Ghana, 1957 –1963
 Edward Kwame Wiredu, Chief Justice of Ghana, 2001 – 2003

Politics 

 Alexander Kwamina Afenyo-Markin, lawyer and politician
 Ebenezer Ako-Adjei, politician and member of the 'Big Six'
 Christopher Ameyaw-Akumfi, academic and politician
 J B Danquah, lawyer, politician, scholar and a member of the 'Big Six'
Albert Kan Dapaah, politician and chartered accountant, Assistant Grand Master, Grand Lodge of Ghana
John Henry Martey Newman, lawyer, Chief of Staff under the presidency of John Atta Mills
Emmanuel Obetsebi-Lamptey, lawyer, politician and a member of the 'Big Six'
Victor Owusu, lawyer and politician, former Attorney General and Minister of Justice, Leader of the Opposition in the Third Republic,1979 –1981
Harry Sawyerr, politician and quantity surveyor
John van der Puije, Gold Coast merchant, newspaper publisher, traditional ruler and politician
Henry van Hien, Gold Coast merchant and politician

Traditional rulers or monarchs 
Oyeeman Wereko Ampem II, Gyaasehene of Akuapem and Amanokromhene, 1975 – 2005
Ofori Atta I, Okyenhene or King of Akyem Abuakwa, 1912 – 1943
Daasebre Oti Boateng, Omanhene of New Juaben, 1992 – 2021
Azzu Mate Kole II, Konor of the Manya Krobo Traditional Area, 1939 – 1990
Osei Tutu Agyeman Prempeh II, Asantehene, 1931 – 1970 
Otumfuo Osei Tutu II, Asantehene, 1999 – present, Grand Patron, Grand Lodge of Ghana and Sword Bearer, United Grand Lodge of England

Urban planning and architecture  

Theodore S. Clerk, urban planner and first Ghanaian architect

References

External links 
 District Grand Lodge of Ghana 
 Grand Lodge of Ghana
 Grand Lodge of Ireland
 The Grand Lodge of Antient, Free and Accepted Masons of Scotland
 United Grand Lodge of England

Freemasonry
Freemasonry by country
Ghanaian Freemasons
Grand Lodge of Scotland
Grand Lodges
Ghana
Organizations established in 1810
Supraorganizations
United Grand Lodge of England